The Diocese of Ruvuma is a southern diocese in the Anglican Church of Tanzania: its current bishop is the Rt Rev Raphael Haule.

Notes

Anglican Church of Tanzania dioceses
Ruvuma Region